Layla Eveleen McCarter (born April 19, 1979) is an American professional boxer. She has held multiple world titles across five weight divisions, having held the WIBF welterweight title since 2018 and previously the IFBA featherweight title in 2000; the WIBF super lightweight title in 2003; the WBA female lightweight title twice between 2007 and 2009; and the WBA female super welterweight title in 2012.

In 2016 January Ring magazine considered Layla McCarter the 10th best female boxer of all time.
She was also awarded by the Nevada and California Boxing Hall of Fame, and recently in February 2017 she was signed by Mayweather Promotions, as its second female boxer. ring TV

Public challenge to Ronda Rousey 
On July 31, 2015, Ronda Rousey's trainer, Edmond Tarverdyan, expressed the belief that his fighter "can win the boxing world title" while discussing a potential fight with Cris Cyborg. After noting that "Ronda spars with boxing world champions that punch way harder than Cyborg", Tarverdyan claimed that she "has never lost a round in the gym. A round. With boxing world champions".

Layla McCarter is the current Big Knockout Boxing female champion and immediately challenged Ronda Rousey to boxing match.

Alongside Amanda Serrano went on to criticize Rousey's stand-up fighting technique stating in the Guardian  “She’s very good at what she does, but she needs to stay in her lane because boxing takes a lot of experience to reach the top level.

“She better just stay in her lane because she’s going to get hurt.”.

Professional boxing record

References

External links
 

1978 births
Sportspeople from Alameda, California
World boxing champions
World welterweight boxing champions
Welterweight boxers
Lightweight boxers
Living people
American women boxers
American female kickboxers
Kickboxers from California
21st-century American women